The Elijah List is a non-denominational Christian prophetic website created by Steve Shultz in 1997 with 280,000 subscribers as of January 2018. The name of the site comes from the Old Testament prophet, Elijah.  The list's mission statement says that it "is called to transmit around the world, in agreement with Holy Scripture, fresh daily prophetic 'manna' from the Lord, regarding the days in which we live." The site states that it "receives content from a large number of American "prophets" and "seers"," and contains links to many of their sites.

Various members of "the prophetic movement" have credited their exposure and/or popularity to their writings on the Elijah List, including Catherine Brown, Chuck Pierce, Kim Clement (now deceased), Kathie Walters and Victoria Boyson.

The Elijah List was holding conferences as early as November 2000. It gained significant readership following the September 11 attacks in 2001. In a March 2006 profile, Charisma noted that "The Elijah List has more than 127,000 subscribers and has become the largest platform for prophetic ministers."

Controversy
As of 2023, a rift has emerged among figures associated with Elijah List and Pentecostalism more broadly, with some Pentecostals and self-proclaimed prophets accusing others of promoting false theological teachings, despite their overall agreement on political issues such as supporting Donald Trump and denying the outcome of the 2020 election.

See also
 Prophecy

References

External links
The Elijah List - "Prophetic Words and Prophecies"

Charismatic and Pentecostal Christianity
Christian miracles
Christian websites
Internet properties established in 1997
Spiritual gifts